John Ayrton Paris, FRS (178524December 1856) was a British physician.  He is most widely remembered as a possible inventor of the thaumatrope, which he published with W. Phillips in April 1825.

Life
Paris was a medical researcher of distinction, for example making one of the earliest observations of occupational causes of cancer when, in 1822, he recognised that their exposure to arsenic fumes might be contributing to the unusually high rate of scrotal skin cancer among men working in copper-smelting in Cornwall and Wales (his conclusions on this subject are included in a book that is also a visitor's guide to West Cornwall). He also wrote about the accidents caused by the use of explosives in mines, and gave lectures to the Royal Geological Society of Cornwall on chemistry as well as serving as the society's first secretary. He was elected president of the Royal College of Physicians in 1844, an office he held until his death. He was elected a Fellow of the Royal Society in June 1821. He was an advocate of the use of scientifically assessed herbal preparations in medical treatment.

The exact date of Paris's birth is uncertain but has been noted as 7th August, 1785, as is its location: some sources list him as born in Cambridge, others as born in Edinburgh, a city with which he certainly had some links.

Works
 Pharmacologia : corrected and extended, in Accordance with the London Pharmacopoeia of 1824, and with the generally advanced State of chemical Science. – New York : Duyckinck, 3rd American from the 6th London Ed. 1825 Digital edition by the University and State Library Düsseldorf
 Appendix to the 8th Edition of the Pharmacologia : with some Remarks on various Criticisms upon the London Pharmacopoeia of 1836. – London : Highley, 1838. Digital edition by the University and State Library Düsseldorf

He wrote a number of substantial medical books, including Medical Jurisprudence (co-authored; 1823), a Pharmacologia which first appeared in 1820 and went through numerous editions, Elements of Medical Chemistry (1825) and a Treatise on Diet (1826).  He also produced memoirs of other physicians for the Royal College, and Davy's first biography, The Life of Sir Humphry Davy (1831).

Around 1824 Paris wrote Philosophy in Sport made Science in Earnest: Being an Attempt to Implant in the Young Mind the First Principles of Natural Philosophy by the Aid of the Popular Toys and Sports of Youth. It was first published anonymously in 1827, but posthumous editions were credited to Paris. It showed how to use simple devices to demonstrate scientific principles.

 A Guide To The Mount's Bay And The Land's End: comprehending the topography, botany, agriculture, fisheries, antiquities, mining, mineralogy, and geology of western Cornwall. (1828) London: Thomas and George Underwood.

References

External links

19th-century English medical doctors
British inventors
British biographers
Fellows of the Royal Society
1785 births
1856 deaths
Presidents of the Royal College of Physicians